Make Em Say may refer to:

"Make Em Say", a song by NLE Choppa from the 2020 album Top Shotta
"Make 'Em Say", a song by Meek Mill from the 2009 mixtape Flamerz 2.5: The Preview

See also
"Make Her Say", a 2009 song by Kid Cudi
"Make 'Em Say Uhh!", a 1998 song by Master P